Belur is a  Kolkata Suburban Railway  station on the Howrah–Bardhaman main line and Howrah–Bardhaman chord. It is located in Howrah in the state of West Bengal. It serves the town of Belur and the surrounding areas. It is 7 km from Howrah railway station.

History
East Indian Railway Company started construction of a line out of Howrah for the proposed link with Delhi via Rajmahal and Mirzapur in 1851.

The first passenger train in eastern India ran from Howrah to Hooghly on 15 August 1854. The track was extended to Raniganj by 1855.

Electrification
Electrification of Howrah–Burdwan main line was completed with 25 kV AC overhead system in 1958. The Howrah–Sheoraphuli–Tarakeswar line was electrified in 1957–58.

See also
 Belur, West Bengal
 Belur Math
 Belur Math railway station

References

Railway stations in Howrah district
Howrah railway division
Kolkata Suburban Railway stations